Pine Bush may refer to:

in New Zealand
Pine Bush, New Zealand, a locality in the Southland region of New Zealand

in the United States
 Pine Bush, New York a hamlet in Orange County, New York
 Albany Pine Bush, a pine barrens ecosystem near Albany, New York